The 2008–09 Turkish Ice Hockey Super League season was the 17th season of the Turkish Ice Hockey Super League, the top level of ice hockey in Turkey. Six teams participated in the league.

Regular season

Playoffs

Semifinals 
 Başkent Yıldızları Spor Kulübü - Polis Akademisi ve Koleji 2:6/2:14
 Kocaeli Büyükşehir Belediyesi Kağıt Spor Kulübü - İstanbul Paten Spor Kulübü 38:0/16:0

3rd place 
 İstanbul Paten Spor Kulübü - Başkent Yıldızları Spor Kulübü 3:24

Final 
 Polis Akademisi ve Koleji - Kocaeli Büyükşehir Belediyesi Kağıt Spor Kulübü 11:6/11:3

External links 
Season on hockeyarchives.info

TBHSL
Turkish Ice Hockey Super League seasons
TBSHL